Karunakalage Sajeewa Chanaka de Silva (born 11 January 1971) is a former Sri Lankan cricketer. A left-arm fast-medium bowler, he played eight Test matches and 38 One Day Internationals for Sri Lanka between 1996 and 2000. He made his Twenty20 debut on 17 August 2004, for Burgher Recreation Club in the 2004 SLC Twenty20 Tournament.

Trivia
Sajeewa de Silva along with Russel Arnold set the record for the highest 10th wicket runstand for Sri Lanka in ODI cricket with 51 runs.

References 

1971 births
Living people
Basnahira North cricketers
Basnahira South cricketers
Sri Lankan cricketers
Sri Lanka Test cricketers
Sri Lanka One Day International cricketers